The Rebekah Colberg Cabrera Coliseum (Spanish: Coliseo Rebekah Colberg Cabrera), named in honor of Rebekah Colberg, is an indoor arena in Puerto Rico dedicated to entertainment and sports. It is located at Cabo Rojo, Puerto Rico.

Among many Sports activities held in this venue:
 Community Basketball.
 World's Best 10K, track & field.
 Indias de Mayagüez 2009 season, Liga de Voleibol Superior Femenino.
 NBA Basketball Sin Fronteras.
 World Wrestling Council Shows
 Fencing events at the 2010 Central American and Caribbean Games.

Gallery

References

External links
Cabo Rojo Municipality

Indoor arenas in Puerto Rico
Basketball venues in Puerto Rico
Cabo Rojo, Puerto Rico
2010 Central American and Caribbean Games venues